A great number of words of Persian origin have entered the Turkish language. The following is a list of a number of these loanwords.

See also
List of replaced loanwords in Turkish

References

External links
Iranian Elements in Azeri Turkish

Persian loanwords in Turkish
Persian words similar to other languages